Physics Essays is a peer-reviewed scientific journal covering theoretical and experimental physics. It was established in 1988 and the editor-in-chief is E. Panarella.

Abstracting and indexing 
The journal is or has been indexed and abstracted in the following bibliographic databases:
Chemical Abstracts Service
China National Knowledge Infrastructure
EBSCO Information Services
Emerging Sources Citation Index
INSPIRE-HEP
Scopus, up to 2017

The journal was indexed in Current Contents/Physical, Chemical, and Earth Sciences and the Science Citation Index Expanded until it was dropped in 2015. After re-evaluation, it is now included in the Emerging Sources Citation Index. According to the Journal Citation Reports, the journal had a 2013 impact factor of 0.245.

References

External links 
 

Quarterly journals
Physics journals
Publications established in 1988
English-language journals